X6 or X-6 may refer to:

Arts, entertainment, and media
 Mega Man X6, the sixth video game in the Mega Man X series

Electronics
 Nokia X6 (disambiguation), multiple touchscreen smartphones
 Roland Fantom X6, a synthesizer

Transportation

Aircraft
 Airbus Helicopters X6, a proposed 19-seat twin-engined heavy lift helicopter
 Convair X-6, a proposed nuclear-powered aircraft
 Draganflyer X6, a commercial unmanned aerial vehicle

Automobiles
 Austin X6, a British mid-size sedan
 Beijing X6, a Chinese mid-size SUV
 Bestune X6, a Chinese compact concept SUV
 BMW X6, a German mid-size luxury SUV
 Forthing Jingyi X6, a Chinese mid-size crossover
 Geely Yuanjing X6, a Chinese compact SUV
 Landwind X6, a Chinese mid-size SUV
 Sehol X6, a Chinese compact SUV

Motorcycles
 Suzuki X6, a Japanese motorcycle

Routes
 X6 (New York City bus), a bus route in New York City, New York, United States

Trains
 LSWR X6 class, a British locomotive
 SJ X6, a Swedish trainset

See also
 6X (disambiguation)